Bosque San Diego La Barra is a forest of the Santa Ana Department, El Salvador. It lies on the eastern side of Lake Güija and south of Laguna de Metapan.

References

Forests of El Salvador
Santa Ana Department